Dracula: A Chamber Musical is a 1997 Canadian musical adaptation of Bram Stoker's 1897 novel Dracula. The book and lyrics are by Richard Ouzounian and the music and orchestration are by Marek Norman. After premiering at the Neptune Theatre in Halifax, Nova Scotia, in 1997, Dracula in 1999 became the first Canadian musical to be staged at the Stratford Shakespeare Festival.

Dracula was a popular success, enjoying a six-month run. Ouzounian, who was head of creative arts programming for TVOntario, arranged for the musical to be filmed and broadcast in collaboration with CBC Television. The special earned Juan Chioran a 2000 Gemini Award for Best Performance in a Performing Arts Program or Series for his portrayal of the title role. Dracula has since been staged in regional theatres across the United States and Canada.

Plot

Act I
Jonathan Harker, a young solicitor, travels from England to Transylvania to finalize a contract for Count Dracula to purchase Carfax Abbey. Harker is held captive in Dracula's castle for several weeks before escaping. He sends a telegram to his fiancée, Mina Murray, who joins him in Budapest, where they are married. Mina's friend Lucy Westenra accepts the marriage proposal of Harker's friend Dr Jack Seward, but their idyll is shattered by escaped lunatic Renfield, who warns that his master is coming for Lucy. She is soon seduced and bitten by Dracula, who has arrived in England and fallen in love with her. As Lucy weakens, Seward sends for his former teacher Abraham Van Helsing. Van Helsing diagnoses Lucy's illness as the attack of a nosferatu but is too late to save her. Lucy rises as a vampire and Van Helsing, Harker and Seward destroy her. Dracula vows to destroy Harker's love as Harker has destroyed his.

Act II
Dracula and Van Helsing vow to battle to the death. Mina reads Jonathan's account of his captivity and pledges to remain at his side regardless of what Dracula may do to separate them. However, Dracula seduces and attacks her, beginning her vampiric transformation. Harker swears to free her from Dracula's thrall. Van Helsing and Seward burn the Abbey but do not find Dracula. Renfield and Mina, each sympathizing with the other, promise each other to resist Dracula's evil influence but Dracula discovers them, snaps Renfield's neck for betraying him and flees to Transylvania with Mina. Van Helsing, Seward and Harker pursue them. Moments before sunrise the men corner and destroy Dracula, freeing Mina from the vampire's curse.

Halifax 1997 cast
 Christopher Shyer - Count Dracula
 Brian Hill - Johnathon Harker
 Jayne Lewis - Mina Murray
 Cliff LeJeune - Renfield
 Elizabeth Beeler - Lucy Westenra
 Victor A. Young - Abraham Van Helsing
 Bruce Clayton - John Seward
 David Renton - Narrator

Halifax 1998 cast
 Christopher Shyer - Count Dracula
 Roger Honeywell - Johnathon Harker
 June Crowley - Mina Murray
 Cliff LeJeune - Renfield
 Melissa Thomson - Lucy Westenra
 Gordon McLaren - Abraham Van Helsing
 Kevin Hicks - John Seward

Stratford cast
 Juan Chioran - Count Dracula
 Roger Honeywell - Jonathan Harker
 June Crowley - Mina Murray
 Benedict Campbell - Renfield
 Amy Walsh - Lucy Westenra
 Michael Fletcher - Abraham Van Helsing
 Shawn Wright - Jack Seward

Critical response
Horror scholar and critic David J. Skal cites Dracula: A Chamber Musical as "[p]erhaps the most satisfying stage treatment around the time of Dracula's hundredth birthday". He singles out Chioran for praise,  calling his performance "an impressive amalgam of twentieth-century Draculas" and "menacing yet darkly romantic". Writing of a 2002 production mounted at the North Shore Music Theatre in Beverly, Massachusetts, Variety called the efforts of Ouzounian and Norman "flawed by sameness" but "thoroughly professional without being able to shake off the influence of Webber in 'Phantom' mode".

Notes

References
 Atkey, Mel (2006). Broadway North: The Dream of a Canadian Musical Theatre. Dundurn Press Ltd. .
 Skal, David J. (2004). Hollywood Gothic: The Tangled Web of Dracula from Novel to Stage to Screen. Macmillan. .

External links
 Dracula: A Chamber Musical at Internet Movie Database

Plays based on Dracula
1997 musicals
Musicals based on novels
Canadian musicals
Vampires in music
Songs about vampires
Works set in castles
Works based on Dracula